The 1884–85 season was Morton Football Club's eighth season in which they competed at a national level, entering the Scottish Cup.

Fixtures and results

Scottish Cup

1.An Abercorn protest was upheld and the game was ordered to be replayed.
2. Abercorn and Morton both qualified for the second round.

Renfrewshire Cup

3. A Morton protest was upheld and the fixture was ordered to be replayed.

Greenock Charity Cup

4. Game was abandoned near full time due to a pitch invasion. A replay was ordered, which Athletic declined so Morton were awarded the cup.

Friendlies

References

External links
Greenock Morton FC official site

Greenock Morton F.C. seasons
Morton